Hemeln is an outlying village (Ortsteil) in the borough of the town of Hann. Münden. The village lies on the right bank of the Weser River, 12 km from the city proper.  The highways L561 and L560 run through the community. The village's population of some 960 includes those of the two neighbouring villages, Glashütte (100 residents)and Bursfelde (40).  The parish chair is Alfred Urhahn.

The village has numerous social and service organizations, a kindergarten and a grammar school.

There are a few inns for food and lodging. 
Since the village is not too far from Goettingen, it is a popular outing place for the university's students, who can sit in a Gaststätte, enjoying each other's company and the scenery.

The earliest known name reference to Hemeln is in 834, the year in which Frankish emperor Ludwig ceded Hemeln to the Corvey Abbey.

In 1342 the village was severely flooded.  Again, in May 1943, the village suffered flood damage, this time due to RAF bombing and destruction of the 
Edersee dam.

The church was built in 1681 as a replacement for a small church dating to 1175 and destroyed in the Thirty Years' War.  The church steeple, though, dates from around the beginning of the thirteenth century, when it served as a watchtower.  There is also an abbey church in Bursfelde.

Since at least 1342, the village has been connected by the Veckerhagen Ferry (Fähre Hemeln - Veckerhagen) to the larger village of Veckerhagen in northern Hesse directly across the river. Today the ferry serves automotive, bicycle, and foot traffic.

Son of Hemeln

Reference material

 Willi Osenbrück, Hemeln 834–1984. Beiträge zur Geschichte eines Oberweserdorfes. 1984, 443 pp.
 Heinz Potthast, Beispiele zum Werden einer Kulturlandschaft im Raum Hemeln-Bursfelde. Flurnamen, alte Wege, Wüstungen. Sydekum-Schriften zur Geschichte der Stadt Münden 9. Münden 1984
 Walter Henckel, Am Weserradweg bei Hemeln. Auf Entdeckungstour zwischen Hannoversch Münden und Bursfelde. E.g. Kultur- und Naturförderverein Hemeln e. V., Husum Verlag, Husum 2007

Villages in Lower Saxony
Bramwald